Paul Schwinghammer is a bass angler in Minnesota who began his fishing career in 2006 with two top 20 finishes.

Titles/Honors
2007 Silverado Pro-Am Amateur Angler of the Year
1st Place 2007 Silverado Shootout champion
2nd Place Fishers of Men Green Lake, Spicer 2008
3rd Place Disabled Veterans Tournament Big Marine 2008
4th Place Silverado Pro-Am Green Lake, Spicer, MN 2007
4th Place Fishers of Men Waconia 2007
4th Place Viking Invitational 2007
7th Place Silverado Pro-Am Lake Minnetonka 2007
11th Place Silverado Pro-Am Le Homme Dieu 2007
11th Place Viking Invitational 2005
2nd Place Overall Fishers of Men Minnesota West 2007
21st Place Overall Fishers of Men Minnesota West 2006

Stats
Tournament fisherman since 2006
Tournaments Fished: ~30
Tournaments Won: 1
Top 10 finishes: 7

See also
 List of American fishers

External links
Official Blog Site
DHS Fishing Home Page

American fishers
Sportspeople from Minnesota
1976 births
Living people